Hyponephele lupina, the Oriental meadow brown or branded meadowbrown, is a butterfly of the family Nymphalidae. It is found in North Africa, south western Europe, southern Russia, Asia Minor, southern Siberia, Middle Asia, Iran and from Baluchistan to Nepal.Seitz describes it thus- lupinus Costa (47 e) is rather considerably larger than the forms [of Epinepele]  so far named; the rusty yellow on the underside of the forewing is brighter, the underside of the hindwing strongly speckled. Southern Italy, Greece.

References

External links
Butterflies of Bulgaria
Leps Italy
Lepidoptera Turkey
"Hyponephele Muschamp, 1915" at Markku Savela's Lepidoptera and Some Other Life Forms

Hyponephele
Butterflies of Asia
Butterflies of Europe
Butterflies described in 1836
Taxa named by Oronzio Gabriele Costa